Dave Dudley (born David Darwin Pedruska; May 3, 1928 – December 22, 2003) was an American country music singer best known for his truck-driving country anthems of the 1960s and 1970s and his semi-slurred bass. His signature song was "Six Days on the Road", and he is also remembered for "Vietnam Blues", "Truck Drivin' Son-of-a-Gun", and "Me and ol' C.B.". Other recordings included Dudley's duet with Tom T. Hall, "Day Drinking", and his own Top 10 hit, "Fireball Rolled A Seven", supposedly based on the career and death of Edward Glenn "Fireball" Roberts.

Biography

Early life and rise to fame
Born in Spencer, Wisconsin, United States, Dudley's grandparents came from Königsberg in East Prussia, Germany. At the age of 11, he was given a guitar by his grandfather and learned to play the chords.

He had a short career as a semi-professional baseball player. After he suffered an arm injury, he was no longer able to play baseball. He then decided to pursue a career in country music. He was one of the earliest artists to record for the National Recording Corporation, with "Where's There's A Will" (1959).

Dudley was injured once again in 1960, this time in a car accident, setting back his career in music. He first appeared on the Country charts in 1961 with "Maybe I Do", released by Vee Records. He later moved to Golden Wing Records.

Height of his career
In 1963, "Six Days on the Road" became a hit for Dudley. The song was written by Earl Green and Peanutt Montgomery. It sold over one million copies, and was awarded a gold disc.

In the original version of the song as recorded by Dudley the lyrics include the words "...I'm taking little white pills and my eyes are open wide..." a reference to the stimulants some truckers used to keep driving (and make their delivery times) when they needed sleep. Some remakes of the song replace these words with a reference to looking at the white lines on the road.

In 1963, Dudley moved on to Mercury Records. By the end of 1963, he released his first single from the label, "Last Day in the Mines". Dudley scored more big hits in the 1960s, including "Truck Drivin' Son-of-a-Gun", "Trucker's Prayer" and "Anything Leaving Town Today". "Six Days on the Road" was subsequently recorded by several other artists including George Thorogood and the Destroyers, Steve Earle, The Flying Burrito Brothers and Sawyer Brown.

Dudley continued to have success into the 1970s, while continuing to record for Mercury Records. He had some country Top 10s in the 1970s, including "Comin' Down" and "Fly Away Again". By the late 1970s, his success on the charts was beginning to fade, although Dudley amassed thirty-three Top 40 Country hits.

In 1978, Dudley's name became known to the audience in Germany after the German country band Truck Stop had a single Top 10 hit in Germany, titled "Ich möcht’ so gern Dave Dudley hör’n" ("I would like to listen to Dave Dudley so much, to Hank Snow and Charley Pride").

Late career and death
In the 1980s, Dudley continued to record sporadically, and remained popular in concert. During this time, he was elected to the 'Nashville Teamsters Truck Drivers Union', receiving a solid gold membership card from the union. During this time, he also found out that he had a big fan base in Europe, and he decided to try to appeal more to this market. Dudley purchased Staples Lake Resort in the mid 1970s and ran a successful business/resort there until the mid to late 1980s with wife, Marie. During his ownership he also sponsored multiple country music festivals on the property.

In total, Dudley recorded more than 70 albums. However, he did not manage to reclaim his past success, and neither his single "Where's That Truck?", recorded with disc jockey Charlie Douglas, nor the track "Dave Dudley, American Trucker", recorded in 2002 in the wake of the September 11, 2001 terrorist attacks, helped revive his career. Few of his hits have made it onto CDs and albums, creating a market for his vintage vinyl recordings.

Dudley died on December 22, 2003, aged 75, after suffering a heart attack in his car in a parking lot in Danbury, Wisconsin.

Discography

Albums
{| class="wikitable"
! Year
! Album
! US Country
! Label
|-
| 1963
| Dave Dudley Sings Six Days on the Road
| align="center"| 16
| Golden Wing
|-
| rowspan="3"| 1964
| Songs About the Working Man
| align="center"| 19
| rowspan="21"| Mercury
|-
| Travelin' with Dave Dudley
| align="center"| 8
|-
| Talk of the Town
| align="center"| 16
|-
| rowspan="3"| 1965
| Rural Route No. 1
| align="center"| —
|-
| Truck Drivin' Son-of-a-Gun
| align="center"| 3
|-
| Greatest Hits
| align="center"| —
|-
| rowspan="3"| 1966
| There's a Star-Spangled Banner Waving Somewhere
| align="center"| 12
|-
| Lonelyville
| align="center"| 6
|-
| Free and Easy
| align="center"| 10
|-
| rowspan="2"| 1967
| My Kind of Love
| align="center"| —
|-
| Dave Dudley Country
| align="center"| 29
|-
| rowspan="2"| 1968
| Greatest Hits Vol. 2
| align="center"| 39
|-
| Thanks for All the Miles
| align="center"| 39
|-
| rowspan="2"| 1969
| One More Mile
| align="center"| 15
|-
| George (And the North Woods)
| align="center"| —
|-
| rowspan="2"| 1970
| The Best of Dave Dudley
| align="center"| 32
|-
| The Pool Shark
| align="center"| 16
|-
| rowspan="2"| 1971
| Dave Dudley Sings Listen Betty (I'm Singing Your Song)
| align="center"| 32
|-
| Will the Real Dave Dudley Please Sing
| align="center"| 27
|-
| 1972
| The Original Traveling Man
| align="center"| 18
|-
| 1973
| Keep On Truckin'''
| align="center"| 22
|-
| rowspan="2"| 1975
| Special Delivery| align="center"| —
| rowspan="4"| United Artists
|-
| Uncommonly Good Country| align="center"| 13
|-
| rowspan="2"| 1976
| 1776| align="center"| —
|-
| Presents| align="center"| —
|-
| 1977
| Chrome and Polish| align="center"| —
| rowspan="2"| Rice
|-
| 1978
| On the Road Again| align="center"| —
|-
| rowspan="2"| 1980
| Interstate Gold| align="center"| —
| rowspan="3"| Sun
|-
| Diesel Duets (w/ Charlie Douglas)
| align="center"| —
|-
| 1981
| King of the Road| align="center"| —
|-
| 1982
| Trucker's Christmas| align="center"| —
| Cetera
|-
| 1983
| 20 Great Truck Driver Favorites| align="center"| —
| Plantation
|-
| 1984
| Nashville Rodeo Saloon| align="center"| —
| rowspan="2"| Bellaphon
|-
| 1985
| Truck Drivin' Man| align="center"| —
|}

Singles
{| class="wikitable"
! rowspan="2"| Year
! rowspan="2"| Single
! colspan="3"| Chart Positions
! rowspan="2"| Album
|-
! width="45"| US Country
! width="45"| US
! width="45"| CAN Country
|-
| 1955
| "Cry Baby Cry"
| align="center"| —
| align="center"| —
| 
| rowspan="7"| singles only
|-
| rowspan="2"| 1956
| "Ink Dries Quicker Than Tears"
| align="center"| —
| align="center"| —
|
|-
| "Rock and Roll Nursery Rhyme"
| align="center"| —
| align="center"| —
| 
|-
| 1959
| "I Just Want to Be Your Friend"
| align="center"| —
| align="center"| —
| 
|-
| 1960
| "It's Gotta Be That Way"
| align="center"| —
| align="center"| —
| 
|-
| 1961
| "Maybe I Do"
| align="center"| 28
| align="center"| —
| 
|-
| 1962
| "Under Cover of the Night"
| align="center"| 18
| align="center"| —
| 
|-
| rowspan="2"| 1963
| "Six Days on the Road"A
| align="center"| 2
| align="center"| 32
| 
| Dave Dudley Sings Six Days on the Road|-
| "Cowboy Boots"
| align="center"| 3
| align="center"| 95
| 
| rowspan="2"| Songs About the Working Man|-
| rowspan="2"| 1964
| "Last Day in the Mines"
| align="center"| 7
| align="center"| 125
| 
|-
| "Mad"
| align="center"| 6
| align="center"| —
| align="center"| —
| Talk of the Town|-
| rowspan="3"| 1965
| "Two Six Packs Away"
| align="center"| 15
| align="center"| —
| align="center"| —
| rowspan="2"| Truck Drivin' Son-of-a-Gun|-
| "Truck Drivin' Son-of-a-Gun"
| align="center"| 3
| align="center"| 125
| align="center"| —
|-
| "What We're Fighting For"
| align="center"| 4
| align="center"| —
| align="center"| —
| rowspan="2"| There's a Star-Spangled BannerWaving Somewhere|-
| rowspan="3"| 1966
| "Viet Nam Blues"
| align="center"| 12
| align="center"| 127
| align="center"| —
|-
| "Lonelyville"
| align="center"| 13
| align="center"| —
| align="center"| —
| Lonelyville|-
| "Long Time Gone"
| align="center"| 15
| align="center"| —
| align="center"| —
| Free and Easy|-
| rowspan="3"| 1967
| "My Kind of Love"
| align="center"| 12
| align="center"| —
| align="center"| —
| My Kind of Love|-
| "Trucker's Prayer"
| align="center"| 23
| align="center"| —
| align="center"| —
| Dave Dudley Country|-
| "Anything Leaving Town Today"
| align="center"| 12
| align="center"| —
| align="center"| 20
| Greatest Hits Vol. 2|-
| rowspan="3"| 1968
| "There Ain't No Easy Run"
| align="center"| 10
| align="center"| —
| align="center"| 5
| rowspan="2"| Thanks for All the Miles|-
| "I Keep Coming Back for More"
| align="center"| 14
| align="center"| —
| align="center"| 6
|-
| "Please Let Me Prove (My Love for You)"
| align="center"| 10
| align="center"| —
| align="center"| 6
| rowspan="2"| One More Mile|-
| rowspan="2"| 1969
| "One More Mile"
| align="center"| 12
| align="center"| —
| align="center"| —
|-
| "George (And the North Woods)"
| align="center"| 10
| align="center"| —
| align="center"| 4
| George (And the North Woods)|-
| rowspan="3"| 1970
| "The Pool Shark"
| align="center"| 1
| align="center"| —
| align="center"| 4
| rowspan="2"| The Pool Shark|-
| "This Night (Ain't Fit for Anything But Drinking)"
| align="center"| 20
| align="center"| —
| align="center"| 22
|-
| "Day Drinkin'" (w/ Tom T. Hall)
| align="center"| 23
| align="center"| —
| align="center"| 20
| single only
|-
| rowspan="3"| 1971
| "Listen Betty (I'm Singing Your Song)"
| align="center"| 15
| align="center"| —
| align="center"| 5
| rowspan="2"| Dave Dudley Sings Listen Betty(I'm Singing Your Song)|-
| "Comin' Down"
| align="center"| 8
| align="center"| —
| align="center"| 17
|-
| "Fly Away Again"
| align="center"| 8
| align="center"| —
| align="center"| 5
| Will the Real Dave Dudley Please Sing|-
| rowspan="3"| 1972
| "If It Feels Good Do It"
| align="center"| 14
| align="center"| —
| align="center"| 26
| rowspan="2"| The Original Traveling Man|-
| "You've Gotta Cry Girl"
| align="center"| 12
| align="center"| —
| align="center"| 14
|-
| "We Know It's Over" (w/ Karen O'Donnal)
| align="center"| 40
| align="center"| —
| align="center"| —
| single only
|-
| rowspan="3"| 1973
| "Keep On Truckin'"
| align="center"| 19
| align="center"| —
| align="center"| 10
| Keep On Truckin'|-
| "It Takes Time"
| align="center"| 37
| align="center"| —
| align="center"| 27
| single only
|-
| "Rollin' Rig"
| align="center"| 47
| align="center"| —
| align="center"| —
| rowspan="5"| Special Delivery|-
| rowspan="2"| 1974
| "Have It Your Way"
| align="center"| 67
| align="center"| —
| align="center"| —
|-
| "Counterfeit Cowboy"
| align="center"| 61
| align="center"| —
| align="center"| —
|-
| rowspan="4"| 1975
| "How Come It Took So Long (To Say Goodbye)"
| align="center"| 74
| align="center"| —
| align="center"| —
|-
| "Fireball Rolled a Seven"
| align="center"| 21
| align="center"| —
| align="center"| 24
|-
| "Wave at 'Em Billy Boy"
| align="center"| —
| align="center"| —
| align="center"| —
| rowspan="3"| Uncommonly Good Country|-
| "Me and Ole C.B."
| align="center"| 12
| align="center"| —
| align="center"| 8
|-
| rowspan="4"| 1976
| "Sentimental Journey"
| align="center"| 47
| align="center"| —
| align="center"| —
|-
| "1776"
| align="center"| —
| align="center"| —
| align="center"| —
| 1776|-
| "38 and Lonely"
| align="center"| 83
| align="center"| —
| align="center"| —
| rowspan="2"| Presents|-
| "Rooster Hill"
| align="center"| —
| align="center"| —
| align="center"| —
|-
| rowspan="3"| 1977
| "Just Memories"
| align="center"| —
| align="center"| —
| align="center"| —
| single only
|-
| "Devils in Heaven Bound Machines"
| align="center"| —
| align="center"| —
| align="center"| —
| rowspan="2"| Chrome and Polish|-
| "Rollin' On (We Gone)"
| align="center"| —
| align="center"| —
| align="center"| —
|-
| rowspan="2"| 1978
| "One A.M. Alone"
| align="center"| 95
| align="center"| —
| align="center"| —
| On the Road Again|-
| "Wayward Wind"
| align="center"| —
| align="center"| —
| align="center"| —
| rowspan="2"| singles only
|-
| 1979
| "Moonlight in Vermont"
| align="center"| —
| align="center"| —
| align="center"| —
|-
| rowspan="4"| 1980
| "Last Run"
| align="center"| —
| align="center"| —
| align="center"| —
| Interstate Gold|-
| "Big Fanny"
| align="center"| —
| align="center"| —
| align="center"| —
| Diesel Duets|-
| "Rolaids, Doan's Pills and Preparation H"
| align="center"| 77
| align="center"| —
| align="center"| —
| rowspan="3"| King of the Road|-
| "Driver"
| align="center"| —
| align="center"| —
| align="center"| —
|-
| rowspan="3"| 1981
| "Eagle"
| align="center"| —
| align="center"| —
| align="center"| —
|-
| "I Do"
| align="center"| —
| align="center"| —
| align="center"| —
| rowspan="2"| singles only
|-
| "I Was Country Before Barbara Mandrell"
| align="center"| —
| align="center"| —
| align="center"| —
|-
| 1983
| "I Wish I Had a Nickel"
| align="center"| —
| align="center"| —
| align="center"| —
| Nashville Rodeo Saloon|}
APeaked at No. 13 on Easy Listening (now Hot Adult Contemporary Tracks).

References

Other sources
 Country Music: The Rough Guide''; Wolff, Kurt; Penguin Publishing

External links
 Dudley profiled in WFMU's Diesel Sniffing Series
 CMT.com: "Six Days on the Road" Singer Dave Dudley dead at 75
 
 

1928 births
2003 deaths
People from Spencer, Wisconsin
American country singer-songwriters
American male singer-songwriters
Country musicians from Wisconsin
National Recording Corporation artists
Jubilee Records artists
Starday Records artists
Mercury Records artists
20th-century American singers
20th-century American male singers
American people of German descent
Singer-songwriters from Wisconsin
Bellaphon Records artists